Perfluoropentane (PFP) or dodecafluoropentane; also known as Perflenapent (INN/USAN) is a fluorocarbon, the fluorinated analogue of pentane.  It is a liquid that boils at slightly over room temperature.

It has several biomedical applications including: propellant for pressurized metered dose inhalers; gas core in microbubble ultrasound contrast agents; and occlusion therapy via the conversion of nanometer liquid droplets into micrometer sized gas microbubbles (acoustic droplet vaporization).

References

Perfluoroalkanes
Ultrasound contrast agents